Natolin is a residential neighborhood in Ursynów, the southernmost district of Warsaw.

Until the 1980s, Natolin and its neighbouring area Wolica, was a small village located right outside the city limits, with numerous orchards. After that it was urbanized with large blocks of flats. Now Natolin is a modern part of Warsaw with many shops, restaurants and houses.

Natolin is home to one of the two campuses of the College of Europe.

Popular places 
 Natolin metro station
 Natolin Park
 Galeria Ursynów Shopping and Service Center
 The Church of Blessed Ladislas of Gielniów at the Przy Bażantarni Street
 The Church of the Presentation of the Lord

References 

Neighbourhoods of Ursynów